Aaron Comrie (born 3 February 1997) is a Scottish professional footballer who plays for as a right-back for Dunfermline Athletic. Comrie previously played for St Johnstone, and had loan spells with Montrose and Peterhead.

Career
Comrie began his career in the youth setup at Celtic joining aged nine, making his way up to under-17 level at which point he was released.

Following his release by Celtic, Comrie signed for St Johnstone in February 2015.

In December 2015, Comrie moved on loan to Montrose initially for one month, then the deal was extended for the remainder of the season.

On 25 August 2016, Comrie made his debut for St Johnstone, coming on as a substitute in the first minute following an injury to Richard Foster away to Hamilton Academical, earning praise afterwards from manager Tommy Wright.

In January 2017, Comrie along with St Johnstone teammate Liam Gordon joined Peterhead on loan until the end of the season.

After returning to St Johnstone, Comrie made his first start for the club, in a 1–1 draw away to Celtic on 26 August 2017, where he was involved in an early collision with his teammate Murray Davidson, which left Comrie with a cut and forced Davidson off with concussion.

At the end of the 2018–19 season, Comrie was released by St Johnstone.

On 15 May 2019, Comrie signed for Scottish Championship club Dunfermline Athletic on a one-year contract with the option of a second.

Career statistics

References

External links

1997 births
Living people
Scottish footballers
Celtic F.C. players
St Johnstone F.C. players
Montrose F.C. players
Peterhead F.C. players
Dunfermline Athletic F.C. players
Scottish Professional Football League players
Association football fullbacks